Cyanoannulus is a fungal genus in the family Annulatascaceae of the Ascomycota. The relationship of this taxon to other taxa within the Sordariomycetes class is unknown (incertae sedis), and it has not yet been placed with certainty into any order. This is a monotypic genus, containing the single species Cyanoannulus petersenii, which was found growing on decorticated wood in a stream in North Carolina.

References

Fungi of the United States
Annulatascaceae
Monotypic Sordariomycetes genera